The 1984 Congoleum Classic was a tennis tournament held February 13, 1984, in California. In singles, José Higueras was the defending champion but lost in the semifinals to Jimmy Connors.

Connors won in the final 6–2, 6–7, 6–3 against Yannick Noah.

Seeds
The top eight seeds received a bye into the second round.

  Jimmy Connors (champion)
  Yannick Noah (final)
  Jimmy Arias (semifinals)
  José Higueras (semifinals)
  Eliot Teltscher (quarterfinals)
  Tim Mayotte (quarterfinals)
  Vitas Gerulaitis (second round)
  Brian Gottfried (third round)
  Scott Davis (quarterfinals)
  Brian Teacher (third round)
  Robert Van't Hof (second round)
  Tim Gullikson (first round)
  Hank Pfister (third round)
  Shlomo Glickstein (quarterfinals)
  Roscoe Tanner (second round)
  Brad Gilbert (second round)

Draw

Finals

Top half

Section 1

Section 2

Bottom half

Section 3

Section 4

References
 1984 Congoleum Classic Draw - Men's Singles

Congoleum Classic - Singles